was a town located in Nishimuro District, Wakayama Prefecture, Japan.

As of 2003, the town had an estimated population of 4,594 and a density of 33.70 persons per km² The total area was 136.31 km.²

On March 1, 2006, Hikigawa was merged into the expanded town of Shirahama.

External links
Official website (in Japanese)

Dissolved municipalities of Wakayama Prefecture
Shirahama, Wakayama